Qais Bin Khalid Al Said (born 20 August 1979 in New York City) is an Omani Twenty20 cricketer active from 2011 who has represented Oman in several Twenty20 international matches. He is a left-handed batsman and a left-arm medium pace bowler.

References

1979 births
Living people
Omani cricketers
Sportspeople from New York City
American people of Omani descent